384 (three hundred [and] eighty-four) is the natural number following 383 and preceding 385. It is an even composite positive integer.

In mathematics
384 is: 
 the sum of a twin prime pair (191 + 193).
 the sum of six consecutive primes (53 + 59 + 61 + 67 + 71 + 73).
 the order of the hyperoctahedral group for n = 4 
 the double factorial of 8.
 an abundant number.
 the third 129-gonal number after 1, 129 and before 766 and 1275.
 a Harshad number in bases 2, 3, 4, 5, 7, 8, 9, 13, 17, and 62 other bases.
 a refactorable number.

Computing
Being a low multiple of a power of two, 384 occurs often in the field of computing. For example, the digest length of the secure hash function SHA-384, the screen resolution of Virtual Boy is 384x224, MP3 Audio layer 1 encoding is 384 kibps, in 3G phones the WAN implementation of CDMA is up to 384 kbit/s.

In other fields
 The year 384 AD.
 The year 384 BC.
 The Jewish year can be 384 days long.
 The Thai lunar calendar can be 384 days long.
 384 is the ISO 3166-1 numeric code for Côte d'Ivoire.
 Asteroid 384 Burdigala.
 The number of lines in the I Ching  (64x6).
 Interstate 384 in the United States.
 USS Parche (SS-384) was a US submarine in the 20th century
 The apogee of the expeditions to the International Space Station is generally 384 km.

References

External links

Integers